York Street was a station on the Chicago Aurora and Elgin Railroad (CA&E) serving Elmhurst, Illinois. Opened on August 25, 1902, as South Elmhurst, it was one of the original stations of the Aurora Elgin and Chicago Railway (AE&C), which became the CA&E. It was significantly rebuilt in 1910, having a brick shelter added to it. Tickets were bought and sold at a nearby confectionery store. The CA&E closed altogether on July 3, 1957.

York Street was the busiest of three CA&E stations in Elmhurst, and was located near a substation. It was the easternmost station for CA&E expresses west of 5th Avenue in Maywood. A bus route serving southern Elmhurst fed into the station, and the Chicago Great Western Railway had a station nearby.

References

Works cited

1902 establishments in Illinois
1957 disestablishments in Illinois
Railway stations opened in 1902
Railway stations closed in 1957
Elmhurst, Illinois